Sud-Ouest (French for southwest) may refer to:

Places 
 Sud-Ouest Region (Burkina Faso), the Burkina Faso region
 Sud-Ouest Region (Cameroon), the Cameroon region
 Ile du Sud-Ouest, an isle in the Cosmoledo atoll
 Le Sud-Ouest, a borough in Montreal, Quebec
 Province du Sud-Ouest, the Southwest Province in Cameroon
 Rivière du Sud-Ouest, a river in Quebec

Companies 
 Sud Ouest (newspaper), a newspaper
 CIT du Sud-Ouest (CITSO), a bus company 
 SNCASO (Société nationale des constructions aéronautiques du sud-ouest), a French former aircraft manufacturer

See also 
 Southwest (disambiguation)
 South West France (disambiguation)